Playing for Success was an initiative in England funded by the Department for Children, Schools and Families, which aimed to raise literacy, numeracy and ICT standards amongst demotivated KS2 and KS3 pupils by holding out-of-school-hours study support centres at football clubs and other sports grounds. The scheme began in 1997; government funding was withdrawn in 2011.

The scheme funded Study Support Centres which used the environment and medium of football, rugby union and other sports to help motivate pupils identified by their schools as being in need of a boost to help them get back up to speed in literacy, numeracy and information and communication technology. The centres were staffed by centre managers, who were qualified and experienced teachers, supported by higher education and further education students working as mentors.

The scheme started in 1997, when the Department for Education and Skills supported a small pilot which was held in FA Premier League clubs; it was extended to Division One clubs a couple of years later. This scheme was extended twice from 2004, through a partnership between the Football Foundation and the Department for Education and Skills. The extension saw new centres open around the country, mainly by involving other sports such as rugby union, rugby league, cricket, hockey, tennis, gymnastics, basketball, ice hockey, and horseracing. By January 2008, 162 clubs were involved with 159 centres, benefiting 210,00 pupils to date.

Funding was withdrawn in 2011 as part of the austerity measures implemented by the 2010 coalition government, in order to save £13.7m per year.

Study Support Centres 
In 2010, there were centres in all regions of England.

References 

Education in the United Kingdom